Alfredo Córdoba Alcala (13 May 1925 – 7 September 2019) was a Mexican footballer. He competed in the men's tournament at the 1948 Summer Olympics.

References

External links
 

1925 births
2019 deaths
Mexican footballers
Mexico international footballers
Olympic footballers of Mexico
Footballers at the 1948 Summer Olympics
Association football midfielders